James Outram Anderson (17 September 1894  – 22 December 1973), commonly known as J.O. Anderson, was an Australian tennis player.

Personal life 
Anderson was the eighth child of James Outram Anderson and his wife Patience (née Laycock). He was educated at Camden Grammar School. 

He married Maud Irene Whitfield (died 1955) on 24 March 1917. They had five children. He married a widow, Mabel Little, on 18 November 1957. Anderson died on 22 December 1973 at Gosford. He was survived by his second wife, as well as the son and four daughters of his first marriage.

In 2013, Anderson was inducted into the International Tennis Hall of Fame.

Career 
Anderson is best remembered for his three victories at his home tournament: the Australasian Championships in 1922, 1924 and 1925. Anderson also won the doubles tournament at the 1922 Wimbledon Championships and 1924 Australian Championships. He was celebrated in Australia for his mascot, a large toy kangaroo which he brought on court.

Between 1919 and 1925 Anderson played in 15 ties for the Australian Davis Cup team and compiled a record of 28 wins and 8 losses.

From 1929 to 1934, Anderson had an endorsement deal with the Alexander Patent Racket Company in Launceston, Tasmania, to produce a range of 'J.O. Anderson' tennis racquets.

Playing Style 
Anderson's best shot was his forehand drive, which he hit with very little topspin. He mastered this shot to compensate for his weak backhand shot. Anderson was nicknamed 'The Greyhound' for his quickness on the tennis court.

Grand Slam finals

Singles: 3 titles

Doubles: 6 (2 titles, 4 runners-up)

References

External links

 Australian Dictionary of Biography – Anderson, James Outram (1894–1973)
 
 
 
 

1894 births
1973 deaths
Australasian Championships (tennis) champions
Australian male tennis players
Tennis people from New South Wales
Wimbledon champions (pre-Open Era)
Grand Slam (tennis) champions in men's singles
Grand Slam (tennis) champions in men's doubles
International Tennis Hall of Fame inductees